A packed storage matrix, also known as packed matrix, is a term used in programming for representing an  matrix. It is a more compact way than an m-by-n rectangular array by exploiting a special structure of the matrix.

Typical examples of matrices that can take advantage of packed storage include:
 symmetric or hermitian matrix
 Triangular matrix
 Banded matrix.

Code examples (Fortran)
Both of the following storage schemes are used extensively in BLAS and LAPACK.

An example of packed storage for hermitian matrix:
complex:: A(n,n) ! a hermitian matrix
complex:: AP(n*(n+1)/2) ! packed storage for A
! the lower triangle of A is stored column-by-column in AP.
! unpacking the matrix AP to A
do j=1,n
  k = j*(j-1)/2
  A(1:j,j) = AP(1+k:j+k)
  A(j,1:j-1) = conjg(AP(1+k:j-1+k))
end do

An example of packed storage for banded matrix:

real:: A(m,n) ! a banded matrix with kl subdiagonals and ku superdiagonals
real:: AP(-kl:ku,n) ! packed storage for A
! the band of A is stored column-by-column in AP. Some elements of AP are unused.
! unpacking the matrix AP to A
do j=1,n
  forall(i=max(1,j-kl):min(m,j+ku)) A(i,j) = AP(i-j,j)
end do
print *,AP(0,:) ! the diagonal

Arrays
Matrices